10 Seconds is the first studio album by American hip hop producer Jel. It was released on Mush Records on October 22, 2002. The title derives from the limited sampling time of E-mu SP-1200.

Critical reception
Martin Woodside of AllMusic gave the album 4 stars out of 5, saying: "Built from pieces, albeit very small pieces, of other people's music, Jel has created an energetic, expansive sound that is all his own." He added: "Moody and atmospheric, this varied mix is remarkably cohesive."

Brad Haywood of Pitchfork gave the album a 6.9 out of 10, saying: "Although 10 Seconds doesn't break much new ground, it is a good disc, true to Jel's concept and very listenable." Lisa Hageman of CMJ New Music Report called it "an impressive compilation of a beat-maker whose close attention to detail is definitely paying off."

Writing for Pitchfork, Keith Fullerton Whitman said: "This record encapsulates the sort of subtle melancholy all but missing in contemporary productions."

Track listing

References

External links
 

2002 debut albums
Jel (music producer) albums
Mush Records albums
Instrumental hip hop albums